Patrick Corcoran (16 June 1893 – 1967) was a Scottish professional footballer who played as an outside right for Clyde, Celtic and Hamilton Academical in the Scottish Football League and for Plymouth Argyle in the English Football League.

Career
Corcoran was born in Glasgow. He was on the books of Clyde for several years and won a Glasgow Cup with the club in 1914 but played on on loan with various clubs including Celtic and Hamilton Academical, where he then had a permanent (though still fairly brief) spell.

He moved to England in late 1920 to play for Plymouth Argyle. He made 198 appearances for the club in all competitions over six seasons, the last of which came in December 1925; he remained with the club til the following summer but was recovering from appendicitis. In 1923 he was selected for the Home Scots v Anglo-Scots international trial match alongside Plymouth teammate Fred Craig (with whom he had also played at Hamilton), though neither would gain a full cap.

He then spent a short period at Torquay United, then still a Southern League club, before joining Luton Town, but is believed not to have played for either in competitive fixtures. He returned to Scotland for additional fleeting spells at Bathgate and East Stirlingshire.

Corcoran died in 1967.

References

1893 births
1967 deaths
Place of death missing
Footballers from Glasgow
Scottish footballers
Association football outside forwards
Scottish Junior Football Association players
Celtic F.C. players
Bathgate F.C. players
Royal Albert F.C. players
Clyde F.C. players
Renton F.C. players
Bellshill Athletic F.C. players
Hamilton Academical F.C. players
Albion Rovers F.C. players
East Stirlingshire F.C. players
Shelbourne F.C. players
Plymouth Argyle F.C. players
Torquay United F.C. players
Luton Town F.C. players
Scottish Football League players
English Football League players